Camas Luinie is a hamlet in Lochalsh, Scottish Highlands and is in the council area of Highland. It is the start of the walk to the impressive Falls of Glomach via Glen Elchaig.

References

Populated places in Lochalsh